KIIT may refer to:

 Kalinga Institute of Industrial Technology, also known as KIIT University, Bhubaneswar
 KIIT-CA, a low-power television station (channel 11) licensed to North Platte, Nebraska, United States